The British Journal for the History of Science (a.k.a. BJHS) is an international academic journal published quarterly by Cambridge University Press in association with the British Society for the History of Science. It was founded under its present title in 1962 but was preceded by the Bulletin of the British Society for the History of Science which was itself founded in 1949. The journal publishes scholarly papers and reviews on all aspects of the history of science. The journal is currently edited by Doctor Amanda Rees, who  works at York University.

Previous editors of BJHS 
Amanda Rees (2019–present)

Charlotte Sleigh (2014-2019)

Jon Agar (2009-2014)

Simon Schaffer (2004-2009)

Crosbie Smith (2000-2004)

Janet Browne (1994-2000)

John Hedley Brooke (1989-1994)

David Knight (1982-1989)

Nicholas W. Fisher (1977-1982)

Robert Fox (1971-1977)

Maurice P. Crosland (1966-1971)

H. D. Anthony (1962-1966)

N. H. de V. Heathcote (editor of predecessor journal, Bulletin of the British Society for the History of Science)

English-language journals
History of science journals
Publications established in 1962
Quarterly journals
Cambridge University Press academic journals
Academic journals associated with learned and professional societies of the United Kingdom